St. Catherine of Siena's Church or St. Catherine of Siena Church may refer to:

Philippines
 Santa Catalina de Siena Church (Bambang), Nueva Vizcaya

United Kingdom
 St Catherine of Siena Church, Birmingham 
 St Catherine of Siena Church, Cocking, West Sussex
 St Catherine of Siena Church, Cocking, Chichester
 St Catherine of Siena, Richmond, Sheffield
 Church of Our Lady and St Catherine of Siena, Bow, London

United States
 St. Catherine of Siena Church and School, Reseda, California
 St. Catherine of Sienna Church (Riverside, Connecticut)
 St. Catherine of Sienna Church (Trumbull, Connecticut)
 Chapel on the Rock (Saint Catherine of Siena Chapel), Allenspark, Colorado
 St. Catherine of Siena Catholic Church (Clearwater, Florida)
 St. Mary – St. Catherine of Siena Parish, Charlestown, Massachusetts
 St. Catherine of Siena Roman Catholic Church, Detroit, Michigan
 St. Catherine of Siena Church (New York City)
 St. Catherine of Siena Catholic Church (Wake Forest, North Carolina)
 St. Catherine of Siena (Moscow, Pennsylvania)

See also
 Saint Catherine of Siena Parish School (disambiguation)
 Catherine of Siena